Cartwright Elementary School District is a school district in Phoenix, Arizona, United States which operates 21 schools in the city's Maryvale neighborhood. The district contains twelve K–5 elementary schools, four K–8 elementary schools, four 6th–8th grade middle schools and a preschool. that serve more than 18,000 students.

Early history
The area at 51st Avenue and Thomas Road was settled and homesteaded by Reddick Jasper Cartwright (1837–1914), a native of Illinois, in 1877. In 1884, Tom Brockman, a native of California and fellow homesteader, donated land at 59th Avenue and Thomas Road for a school site. Cartwright and his  neighbors raised enough funds to build the first one-room school house. In 1921, Cartwright School joined a neighboring school known as Independence and the Cartwright School District was founded. Mr. Glenn L. Downs became the first superintendent of the district in 1928. Mr. Downs and his family lived in the residence which is currently the Cartwright Heritage House. The two-story original all brick structure was replaced with the structure which stands today. The Cartwright School was listed in the National Register of Historic Places in 1993.

Schools
 Bret R. Tarver School        
 G. Frank Davidson School
 Marc T. Atkinson Middle School
 Byron A. Barry School
 Glenn L. Downs School
 Palm Lane School
 Cartwright School
 Heatherbrae School
 Peralta School
 Charles W. Harris School
 Holiday Park School
 Raúl H. Castro Middle School
 Desert Sands Middle School
 John F. Long School
 Starlight Park School
 Estrella Middle School
 Justine Spitalny School
 Sunset School
 Frank Borman School
 Manuel "Lito" Peña Jr School
 Tomahawk School

Gallery of Historical Cartwright School

References

External links
 Cartwright Elementary School District

School districts in Phoenix, Arizona
School districts in Maricopa County, Arizona
Historic districts on the National Register of Historic Places in Arizona
National Register of Historic Places in Maricopa County, Arizona
1921 establishments in Arizona
School districts established in 1921